Angle Lake may refer to:

Angle Lake, Alberta, an unincorporated area in Canada
Angle Lake (Alberta), a lake in Canada
Angle Lake in Angle Township, Lake of the Woods County, Minnesota, US
Angle Lake, Washington, in SeaTac, Washington
Angle Lake station, a rail transit station in SeaTac, Washington